Oduvaldo Vianna Filho, known as Vianinha (4 June 1936 – 16 July 1974), was a Brazilian playwright.

Vianinha was born in São Paulo. He started in theater as an actor, in 1955, with the Teatro Paulista do Estudante (São Paulo Students Theatre) group. Polemical and combative, Vianinha was part of Teatro de Arena and debuted as an author in 1959, with Chapetuba Futebol Clube.

In 1973, together with Armando Costa, he created and directed in Rede Globo de Televisão a humorous series called A Grande Família (The Big Family).

His plays A Mão na luva, Allegro desbum, and Rasga coração were repeatedly staged in Brazil. The most critically successful was the last one, Rasga coração, which he ended just a few days before dying of lung cancer. He died in Rio de Janeiro, aged 38.

References

Damasceno, Leslie Hawkins. Cultural space and theatrical conventions in the works of Oduvaldo Vianna Filho. Wayne State University Press, 1996.

External links
Vianinha
Mariangela Alves de Lima - Especial para O Estado de S. Paulo
Brief biography 
RAMOS, Alcides Freire. Vianinha e o Cinema Novo (PDF)
Brief biography with some synopses
A Teledramaturgia de Oduvaldo Vianna Filho: da Tragédia ao Humor - A Utopia da Politização do Cotidiano
Biography

Brazilian male dramatists and playwrights
1936 births
1974 deaths
Deaths from lung cancer
20th-century Brazilian dramatists and playwrights
20th-century Brazilian male writers